This is a list of pidgins, creoles, mixed languages and cants that are based or partially based on Indo-European languages.

Pidgins

Germanic–Slavic

English–Russian-based
Europe
Solombala English

Norwegian–Russian-based
Europe
Russenorsk

Germanic

English-based
Africa
West African Pidgin English (multiple varieties) (Guinea Coast)
Kru Pidgin English
Liberian Interior Pidgin English
Nigerian Pidgin
Cameroonian Pidgin English
Asia
South Asia
Butler English (India)
Southeast Asia
Thai Pidgin English
East Asia
Chinese Pidgin English (in Nauru)
Japanese Bamboo English
Japanese Pidgin English
Korean Bamboo English
Oceania
Australia
Aboriginal Pidgin English
Port Jackson Pidgin English (ancestral to Australian Kriol)
Queensland Kanaka English
Pacific Islands
Micronesia
Micronesian Pidgin English
Nauru Chinese Pidgin English
Polinesia
Samoan Plantation Pidgin
Hawaiian Pidgin English
Melanesia
Papua New Guinea Pidgin
Tok Pisin
Papuan Pidgin English (distinct from Tok Pisin)
Solomon Islands Pijin
Vanuatu Bislama
North America
Native American Pidgin English

German-based
Southwest Africa
Namibian Black German

Indo-Aryan

Assamese-based
Nefamese
Nagameese

Italic (Romance)

General Romance-based
 Mediterranean Basin
  Lingua Franca/Mediterranean Lingua Franca (Sabir, Petit Mauresque or Little Moorish) was spoken in the Mediterranean Basin from the 11th to the 19th century.

French-based
Africa
West Africa
 Français Tirailleur, a Pidgin language  spoken in West Africa by soldiers in the French Colonial Army, approximately 1850–1960.
Asia
Southeast Asia
 Tây Bồi Pidgin French, Pidgin language spoken in former French Colonies in Indochina, primarily Vietnam

Portuguese-based
Africa
Central Africa
Pequeno Português

Portuguese–Spanish-based
Europe
Portuguese–Spanish
Portuñol/Portunhol

Italic (Romance)–Germanic-based

French–English-based
Africa
 Camfranglais in Cameroon (mixed Cameroonian French-English Pidgin)

Different language families-based Pidgins

Indo-European–Bantu

Afrikaans–Sotho-based
Flaaitaal/Tsotsitaal

Afrikaans–Sotho–Zulu 
Camtho

Creoles

Germanic

Afrikaans-based creoles
Flaaitaal/Tsotsitaal (extinct as a creole)
Oorlams Creole

Dutch-based creoles
Atlantic
Caribbean (Dutch West Indies)
Negerhollands (extinct) (US Virgin Islands)
South America
Guyanas
Berbice Creole Dutch (extinct) (Berbice river region)
Skepi Creole Dutch (extinct) (Essequibo River region)
North America
Mohawk Dutch (extinct)
Negro Jersey Dutch ("Neger-Dauts" - "Negro Dutch") (extinct)
Asia
Southeast Asia (Dutch East Indies)
Javindo, in Java, Indonesia (extinct)
Petjo (Peco), in Indonesia; immigrant community in the Netherlands (extinct or critically in danger)

English-based creoles
Atlantic
Caribbean
Western Caribbean
Jamaican Patois (Jamaican Creole English)
Limonese Creole
Bocas del Toro Creole (Panamanian Creole English)
Jamaican Maroon Creole
Belizean Creole
Miskito Coast Creole (Nicaragua Creole English)
Rama Cay Creole
San Andrés–Providencia Creole (Raizal Creole English/Islander Creole English)
Eastern Caribbean
Northern
Bahamian–Turks and Caicos Creole English (Lucayan Archipelago)
Bahamian Creole
Turks and Caicos Creole English
Gullah language (Sea Islands Creole English)
Afro-Seminole Creole
Southern
Virgin Islands Creole (Netherlands Antilles Creole English)
Crucian: Spoken on Saint Croix.
Saint Martin Creole English: Spoken in Saba, Sint Eustatius, Saint Martin.
Leeward Caribbean Creole English
Anguillan Creole
Antiguan Creole
Saint Kitts Creole
Montserrat Creole
Vincentian Creole
Grenadian Creole English
Tobagonian Creole
Trinidadian Creole
Bajan Creole (Barbadian Creole English)
Guyanese Creole
Europe
Western Europe
Middle English (disputed)
Africa
West Africa
Krio (Sierra Leone Creole English)
Equatorial Guinean Pidgin (Pichinglis, Fernando Po Creole English, Bioko Creole English) (now also a Creole language)
Liberian Kreyol 
Ghanaian Pidgin (now also a Creole language)
Nigerian Pidgin (now also a Creole language)
Cameroonian Pidgin (now also a Creole language)
Suriname
Sranan Tongo (Surinamese Creole English)
Saramaccan (Saramacca–Upper Suriname regions)
Surinamese and French Guianese Maroons 
Aluku
Ndyuka (Aukan, Eastern Maroon Creole), in Suriname
Paramaccan
Kwinti, in Suriname
Matawai
Pacific
South East Asian
Singlish
Australia
Australian Kriol
Torres Strait Creole
Pacific Islands
Micronesia
Ngatikese Creole
Polynesia
Hawaiian Creole
Pitkern language (Pitcairn–Norfolk)
Tongan Creole (in Tonga)
Melanesia
Tok Pisin (now also a Creole language) (in Papua New Guinea)
Fijian Creole (in Fiji)
Pijin (now also a Creole language) (in Solomon Islands)
Bislama (in Vanuatu)

German-based creole
Pacific
Melanesia
Unserdeutsch (Rabaul Creole German)

Indo-Aryan

Assamese-based creole
Nagamese Creole
Nefamese

Bengali-based creole 
Andaman Creole Hindi, a creole of Bengali, Hindi and Tamil
Bishnupriya, a creole of Bengali and Manipuri

Hindi-based creole
Andaman Creole Hindi
Haflong Hindi

Romani-based creole
Cyprus
Kurbet

Italic (Romance)

French-based creoles
Americas
 Varieties with progressive aspect marker ape
 Haitian Creole (Kreyòl ayisyen, locally called Creole) 
 Louisiana Creole (Kréyol la Lwizyàn, locally called Kourí-Viní and Creole), the Louisiana French Creole language. (not confuse with Louisiana French or Cajun French)
 Varieties with progressive aspect marker ka
 Antillean Creole is a language spoken primarily in the francophone (and some of the anglophone) Lesser Antilles, such as Martinique, Guadeloupe, Îles des Saintes, Dominica, St. Lucia, Trinidad and Tobago and many other smaller islands. 
 Dominican Creole French 
 Grenadian Creole French 
 Saint Lucian Creole French
 San Miguel Creole French (in Panama)
 French Guianese Creole is a language spoken in French Guiana, and to a lesser degree in Suriname and Guyana.
 Karipúna French Creole, spoken in Brazil, mostly in the state of Amapá. (not confuse with Karipuna or Palikúr a native Arawakan language of Amapá State)
 Lanc-Patuá, spoken more widely in the state of Amapá, is a variety of the former, possibly the same language.
Indian Ocean
Varieties with progressive aspect marker ape – subsumed under a common classification as Bourbonnais Creoles (Mascarene Creoles)
Mauritian Creole, spoken in Mauritius (locally Kreol)
Rodriguan creole, spoken on the island of Rodrigues
Agalega creole, spoken in Agaléga Islands
Chagossian creole, spoken by the former population of the Chagos Archipelago
Réunion Creole, spoken in Réunion
Seychellois Creole, spoken everywhere in the Seychelles and locally known as Kreol seselwa. It is the national language and shares official status with English and French.
Pacific Ocean
Tayo Creole, spoken in New Caledonia

Spanish-based creoles
Americas
Caribbean
Bozal Spanish (in Cuba) (possibly extinct)
Palenquero (in a region of Caribbean coast of Colombia)
Asia
Mindanao, Philippines
Chavacano (Zamboangueño Creole Spanish)

Portuguese-based creoles
Africa
Upper Guinea Creoles
Cape Verdean Creole:  Vigorous use, Cape Verde Islands.
Guinea-Bissau Creole:  Vigorous use. Lingua franca in Guinea-Bissau, also spoken in Casamance, Senegal. Growing number of speakers.
Gulf of Guinea creoles
Angolar: A heavy substrate of Kimbundu, spoken on São Tomé Island, São Tomé and Príncipe.
Annobonese Creole (Fa d'Ambu): Vigorous use. Spoken on Annobón island, Equatorial Guinea
Forro: Forro is becoming the language of social networks. Spoken on São Tomé Island, São Tomé and Príncipe.
Principense Creole: Almost extinct. Spoken on Príncipe island, São Tomé and Príncipe.
Tonga Portuguese (Português dos Tongas)
Americas
Papiamento
Asia
Indo-Portuguese creoles
Southern Indo-Portuguese
Sri Lankan Portuguese creole (almost extinct)
Malabar Coast Indo-Portuguese
Cochin Portuguese Creole (Vypin Creole) (in Kochi) (extinct)
Cannanore Portuguese Creole (in Kannur) (almost extinct)
Coromandel Coast Indo-Portuguese
Bengal Creole Portuguese (extinct)
Northern Indo-Portuguese (Norteiro)
Korlai Portuguese Creole (Kristi): spoken in Korlai, India.
Bombay Portuguese Creole (extinct) 
Daman and Diu Portuguese Creole: spoken in Daman and Diu, India. (old decreolization)
East Asian
Macanese
Macanese:  Spoken in Macau. (old decreolization)
Southeast Asian
Malayo-Portuguese
Kristang (Cristão) (Malaccan Creole Portuguese): spoken in Malacca, Malaysia and emigrant communities in Singapore and Perth, Western Australia
Mardijker Creole: by the Mardijker people of Batavia (Jakarta) = Papiá Tugu: in Kampung Tugu, Jakarta, Indonesia. (extinct)
Bidau Creole Portuguese (Timor Pidgin): in the Bidau area of Dili, East Timor. (it was also a creole) (extinct)
Portugis (Ternateño):  in the Ambon, Ternate islands and Minahasa, Indonesia. (extinct)

Mixed languages

Between Indo-European languages
Balto-Slavic
Belarusian–Russian
Trasianka/Meshanka (Belarusian-Russian mixed speech)
Ukrainian–Russian
Surzhyk (Ukrainian-Russian mixed speech)
Germanic
German–Danish
Petuh, Danish grammar and semantics with German vocabulary.
High German–Low German (Low Saxon)
Missingsch, Low Saxon grammar, pronunciation, pragmatics, loanwords and substrate and German vocabulary.
Swedish–Norwegian
Svorsk
Indo-Aryan
Para-Romani (Romani Ethnolects based on Indo-European languages, mainly Romani lexic with other languages grammars and variable Romani grammar features also)
Romani–Other Indo-Iranian
Romani–Iranian
Romani–Persian
Afghanistan Gorbat
Persian Romani (mixed Romani-Persian)
Magati
Romani–Domari–Armenian 
Lomavren (mixed Romani–Domari–Armenian)
Romani–Balto-Slavic
Romani–Slavic
Romano-Serbian (mixed Romani–Serbian)
Bohemian Romani (mixed Romani–Czech) (extinct)
Romani–Germanic
Romani–English
Angloromani (mixed Romani–English)
Scandoromani (mixed Romani–General Scandinavian)
Romani–Swedish
Traveller Swedish 
Romani–Danish
Danish Rodi, Traveller Danish 
Romani–Norwegian
Rodi language, Traveller Norwegian
Romani–Hellenic
Romano-Greek (mixed Romani-Greek)
Romani–Italic (Romance)
Romani–Occitan–Iberian Romance
Caló
Occitan caló (Occitan: caló occitan)
Catalan caló (Catalan: caló català)
Spanish caló (Spanish: caló español)
Portuguese caló (Portuguese: caló português)
Italic (Romance)
Estremaduran–Castilian–Portuguese
Barranquenho (Barranquian)

Indo-European–Other language families
Indo-European–Eskimo–Aleutian
Russian–Aleutian
Mednyj Aleut
Indo-European–Japanese
English–Japanese
Bonin English, a mix of Japanese and English Creole[40]
Indo-European–Pama–Nyungan
English–Warlpiri
Light Warlpiri
English–Gurindji
Gurindji Kriol
Indo-European–Turkic
Greek–Turkish
Cappadocian Greek
Indo-European–Semitic
Greek–Arabic
Cypriot Maronite Arabic
Indo-European–Basque
Romani–Basque
Erromintxela
Indo-European–Uralic
Romani–Estonian
Laiuse Romani (extinct)
Indo-European–Vedda
Sinhalese–Vedda
Vedda
Indo-European–Algic
French–Cree
Michif
Indo-European–Quechuan
Spanish–Quechua
Media Lengua

Cant languages (Cryptolects, Secret languages)

Balto-Slavic

Bulgarian-based
 Meshterski, from Bulgaria

Polish-based
 Grypsera, from Poland

Russian-based
 Fenya from Russia
 Padonkaffsky jargon (or Olbanian) from Runet, Russia

Serbo-Croatian-based
 Banjački, from Serbia
 Šatrovački, from the former Yugoslavia

Celtic

Irish Gaelic-based
 Shelta, from the Irish traveller community in Ireland

Scottish Gaelic-based
 Beurla Reagaird, a Gaelic-based cant used by Highland Traveller community in Scotland

Germanic

Danish-based
 Rotvælsk, from Denmark

Dutch-based
 Bargoens, from the Netherlands

German-based
 Rotwelsch, from Germany

English-based
 Back slang, from London, United Kingdom
 Cockney Rhyming Slang, from London, United Kingdom
 Engsh, from Kenya
 Jejemon from the Philippines
 Polari, a general term for a diverse but unrelated groups of dialects used by actors, circus and fairground showmen, gay subculture, criminal underworld (criminals, prostitutes).
 Sheng from Kenya
 Swardspeak (or Bekimon, or Bekinese), from the Philippines
 Thieves' cant (or peddler's French, or St Giles' Greek), from the United Kingdom
 Tutnese, from the United States

Scots-based
 Scottish Cant a variant of Scots and Romani used by the Lowland Gypsies in Scotland, United Kingdom

Yiddish-based
 Klezmer-loshn, from Eastern Europe

Hellenic

Greek-based
 Podaná, from Greece

Indo-Aryan

Kohistani-based
 Adurgari, from Afghanistan

Urdu-based
 Hijra Farsi, (Urdu and not Farsi-based) from South Asia, used by the hijra and kothi subcultures (traditional indigenous approximate analogues to LGBT subcultures)

Italic (Romance)

French-based
 Javanais, from France
 Louchébem, from France
 Verlan, from France

Galician-based
 Barallete, from Galicia, Spain
 Fala dos arxinas, from Galicia, Spain

Italian-based
 Spasell, from Italy
 Arivaresco, from Vico Pancellorum, Italy

Portuguese-based
 Cafundó (Cupópia), in Cafundó, São Paulo State
 Miguxês, from the emo, hipster subcultures of young netizens in Brazil

Spanish-based
 Bron from León and Asturias, Spain
 Gacería, from Spain
 Germanía, from Spain
 Lunfardo, from Argentina and Uruguay
 Xíriga, from Asturias, Spain

See also
List of Indo-European languages

References

External links
https://www.ethnologue.com/subgroups/pidgin
https://www.ethnologue.com/subgroups/creole
https://www.ethnologue.com/subgroups/mixed-language

Indo-European languages
Pidgins and creoles